Hajji Behzad (also Romanized as Ḩājjī Behzād and Ḩājjībehzād) is a village in Zarrineh Rud-e Shomali Rural District, in the Central District of Miandoab County, West Azerbaijan Province, Iran. At the 2006 census, its population was 1,458, in 340 families.

References 

Populated places in Miandoab County